Naz Shahrokh (born 1969) is an Iranian-born visual artist and educator. She is a conceptual artist and has worked in many mediums, including Persian miniature painting, sculpture, site-specific installation, land art, and video art. Shahrokh lives in Abu Dhabi, and has previously lived in Paris, Los Angeles, and Brooklyn.

Early life and education
Naz Shahrokh was born in 1969 in Tehran, Pahlavi Iran. She is the great granddaughter of Iranian politician and elected Zoroastrian representative, Keikhosrow Shahrokh. Naz grew up with a great respect for her Zoroastrian faith and for its associated traditions. She had a well-travelled childhood: ‘I was born in Iran,’ explains Shahrokh, ‘but I left when I was four and moved to Paris. At age 11, I moved to Los Angeles, and at age 20 I moved to Brooklyn, New York.’ She speaks Persian, French, and English.

Shahrokh received a BFA degree (1993) and MFA degree (1997) in painting; followed by receiving a MS degree (1997) in art history, all of which were from Pratt Institute.

Teaching 
She taught fine art and art history at Pratt Institute, from 1998 to 2004. Shahrokh moved to Egypt in 2004, where she taught at the American University in Cairo until 2006. 

Since 2006, she has served as an assistant professor of art and design at the College of Arts and Sciences at Zayed University in Abu Dhabi, UAE.

Style and influences
Due to her childhood travels and experience of different cultures, Shahrokh's work has many rich and varied inspirations. Her inspirations include: Persian miniature painting, 'Land art and earthworks, Minimalism and Conceptual art, and ephemeral Native American sandpainting'. The majority of her materials are detritus, either synthetic or organic, or a combination of both. Through her work, Shahrokh seeks to transform these disregarded and commonplace materials into something less ordinary. This deep connection with the natural environment is an important focus in Shahrokh's work.

With her roots in the Zoroastrian faith, she attempts to connect her studio practice with a commitment to making objects that are harmonious with the natural environment. Recycling and reducing waste has been a deep, international concern since the early 1990s, when Shahrokh first began to use recycled paper in her work. As well as feeding ‘Shahrokh’s desire to be in harmony with her environment,’ it is also a form of her own personal conceptual problem solving. Within her studio practice she has collected many different forms of detritus, such as leaves, which she treats and uses as small, miniature canvases, or sticks, bottles and other objects with which she forms large-scale, site-specific installations in the desert landscape.

Much of Shahrokh's works relates directly to her cultural roots, and artistic 'conversations' with the style and beliefs of other artists, such as Ana Mendieta and Joseph Beuys, to which Shahrokh pays homage in her artwork, entitled  '22.1'. An installation work that includes found and collected materials, '22.1' comprises glass jars, folded linen shirts and a silver spoon in a suitcase.

Art as a social or political commentary

Whilst living in New York City, Shahrokh created work in protest at the mayor's decision to stop glass recycling. She created an installation from bottles that took on the topography of a mountain, Stratosphere (2002 to 2004). 

More recently while living in the UAE, her installation Haft-Sin Zazen (2010) made of piles of salt on a pure white cloth, alludes to the regions' reliance on desalination and water treatment. This work was conceptually linked both to the landscape and also to personal meaning for Shahrokh in context to her religious belief system. In her article on Naz Shahrokh’s work, Sharon Parker also links Haft Sin Zazen to Shahrokh’s experience of living in Egypt and relates the salt pyramids to earth mounds in the Egyptian landscape. "Haftsin" is a part of the traditional Iranian New Year celebration and it is important to note that Shahrokh's work, strongly relates to the concepts of community and sharing.

‘In school I tended to focus on concepts. My main focus was recycling – giving new life to materials. I started working with paper, thinking about trees, thinking about materials and how to give them new life’. She created "Column Wall" in Abu Dhabi in 2010 - a very neatly stacked pile of the local 'National' newspapers 'collected over six months, intended to represent the tree that gave its life to produce it'. "Column Wall" could also be mistaken for a piece of architecture - it runs from floor to ceiling of a building, blending in with the surrounding walls and shadows.

Shahrokh makes social or political commentaries, but does not employ the shock tactics other contemporary artists often use. She raises awareness of important community issues, often relating to natural sustainability, through a painstakingly careful use of disregarded items and the peaceful regularity of the shapes and colours that she chooses. With its international influences and ancient philosophical inspirations, Shahrokh's art is a patient and methodical quest 'to be in harmony with her environment.'

See also 

 List of Iranian women artists
 Iranians in the United Arab Emirates

References

External links
 Profile at Zayed University
 Profile at Vimeo
 https://library.shu.edu/walshgallery painting "Leaf Horizon" in Permanent Collection - Walsh Gallery, Seton Hall University 2010.11.0001 - featured in "Lilliput" exhibition in 2009

Living people
1969 births
Iranian women painters
Academic staff of The American University in Cairo
Academic staff of Zayed University
21st-century women artists
People from Abu Dhabi
Emirati people of Iranian descent
Iranian Zoroastrians